Domingo "Sam" Samudio (born March 6, 1937 in Dallas, Texas, United States), better known by his stage name Sam the Sham, is an American former rock and roll singer. Sam the Sham was known for his camp robe and turban and hauling his equipment in a 1952 Packard hearse with maroon velvet curtains. As the front man for the Pharaohs, he sang on several Top 40 hits in the mid-1960s, including the Billboard Hot 100 runners-up "Wooly Bully" and "Li'l Red Riding Hood".

Early career
Samudio made his singing debut in second grade, representing his school in a radio broadcast. Later, he took up guitar and formed a group with friends, one of whom was Trini Lopez. After graduating from high school, Samudio joined the Navy, where he was known as "Big Sam."  He lived in Panama for six years, until his discharge.

Back in the States, Samudio enrolled in college, studying voice at Arlington State College, now the University of Texas at Arlington. He recalled: "I was studying classical in the daytime and playing rock and roll at night. That lasted about two years, before I dropped out and became a carny."

Post-hit career
In late 1966, three women, Fran Curcio, Lorraine Gennaro, and Jane Anderson, joined as The Shamettes. The group traveled to Asia as Sam the Sham & The Pharaohs and The Shamettes and released the album titled The Sam the Sham Revue (originally to be titled Nefertiti by Sam the Sham and the Pharaohs, which is printed on the inside record labels). Sam also released a solo album in late 1967, titled Ten of Pentacles. In 1970, Sam went off on his own, and in 1971, issued an Atlantic album called Sam, Hard and Heavy, which won the Grammy Award for Best Album Notes in 1972. The album featured Duane Allman on guitar, the Dixie Flyers, and the Memphis Horns. He formed a new band in 1974. In the late 1970s, he worked with baritone saxophonist Joe Sunseri and his band, based in New Orleans. The early 1980s found Sam working with Ry Cooder and Freddy Fender on the soundtrack for the Jack Nicholson film The Border.

After leaving the music business, Sam worked in Mexico as an interpreter and as a mate on small commercial boats in the Gulf of Mexico. Sam later became a motivational speaker and still makes occasional concert appearances. He was inducted into the Memphis Music Hall of Fame in 2016.

Personal life
Sam married Louise Smith on August 28, 1959, in Dallas, Texas. They had one son named Dimitrius Samudio, born on May 28, 1963, in Dallas. They divorced on May 16, 1968, in Dallas.

Most sources refer to Samudio's ancestry as Mexican-American. However, a 1998 article by the Chicago Tribune described Samudio as being of Basque/Apache descent. In a 2007 conversation with music writer Joe Nick Patoski, Samudio described his grandparents fleeing the Mexican Revolution and settling in Texas where his family supported themselves working in the cotton fields.

Sam the Sham and the Pharaohs 

In Dallas in 1961, Sam formed The Pharaohs, the name inspired from the costumes in Yul Brynner's portrayal as pharaoh in the 1956 film The Ten Commandments.  The other members of The Pharaohs were Carl Miedke, Russell Fowler, Omar "Big Man” Lopez, and Vincent Lopez (no relation to Omar). In 1962, the group made a record that did not sell and later disbanded.

In May 1963, Vincent Lopez was playing for Andy and the Nightriders in Louisiana. When their organist quit, Sam joined. Andy and the Nightriders were Andy Anderson, David A. Martin, Vincent Lopez, and Sam. The Nightriders became house band at The Congo Club, near Leesville, Louisiana. It was here that Sam took the name Sam the Sham from a joke about his lack of ability as a vocalist.

In June 1963, The Nightriders headed for Memphis, Tennessee, and became the house band at The Diplomat. In late summer 1963, Andy Anderson and Vincent Lopez left to return to Texas. Sam and bassist David A. Martin replaced them with drummer Jerry Patterson and guitarist Ray Stinnett and changed the band's name to Sam the Sham and the Pharaohs. Shortly thereafter, the band added saxophonist Butch Gibson.

Breakthrough hit 
After paying to record and press records to sell at gigs, Sam the Sham and the Pharaohs wound up with the XL label in Memphis. There they recorded their first and biggest hit, "Wooly Bully", in late 1964. Once MGM picked up the record, "Wooly Bully" ended up selling three million copies and reaching No. 2 on the Billboard Hot 100 on 5 June 1965, at a time when American pop music charts were dominated by the British Invasion.  It was awarded a gold disc. Leonard Stogel was their manager.

Although "Wooly Bully" never reached No. 1, it lingered on the Hot 100 for 18 weeks, the most weeks for any single within the calendar year 1965, 14 of which were in the top 40. The record achieved the distinction of becoming the first Billboard "Number One Record of the Year" not to have topped a weekly Hot 100 and remained the only one for 35 years, until Faith Hill's "Breathe", Lifehouse's "Hanging by a Moment", and Dua Lipa's "Levitating" in 2000, 2001, and 2021, respectively.

Further successes 
The Pharaohs' next releases – "Ju Ju Hand" (No. 26 US, Canadian No. 31) and "Ring Dang Doo" – were minor successes. In late 1965, 11 months after "Wooly Bully", David A. Martin, Jerry Patterson, Ray Stinnett, and Butch Gibson left over a financial dispute. Sam's manager, Leonard Stogel, discovered Tony Gee & The Gypsys at the Metropole Cafe in Times Square, New York City. The band were Tony "Butch" Gerace (bass guitar and vocals), Frankie Carabetta (keyboards, saxophone and vocals), Billy Bennett (drums and percussion), and Andy Kuha (guitar and vocals). This new set of Pharaohs recorded "Li'l Red Riding Hood". On the Hot 100, "Lil' Red Riding Hood" began its two-week peak at No. 2 the week of August 6, 1966, just as another fairy tale title, "The Pied Piper" by Crispian St. Peters, was ending its three-week peak at No. 4. The track did even better by Cash Box Magazines reckoning, reaching No. 1 the same week. It sold over one million copies, and was awarded a gold disc. It also reached No. 2 on the Canadian RPM Magazine chart on August 22, 1966.

A series of mostly novelty tunes followed, all on the MGM label, keeping the group on the charts into 1967. Titles included "The Hair on My Chinny Chin Chin" (US No. 22, Canadian No. 13), "How Do You Catch a Girl" (US No. 27, Canadian No. 12), "I Couldn't Spell !!*@!", and "Oh That's Good, No That's Bad" (US No. 54).

Discography

Albums
As Sam the Sham and the Pharaohs:
Wooly Bully (May 1965) MGM E (Mono)/SE (Stereo) 4297
Their Second Album (November 1965) MGM E/SE 4314
On Tour (March 1966) MGM E/SE 4347
Li'l Red Riding Hood (July 1966) MGM E/SE 4407
The Best of Sam the Sham & The Pharaohs (February 1967) MGM SE 4422
The Sam the Sham Revue [titled Nefertiti in Canada] (October 1967) MGM E/SE 4479
Pharaohization: The Best of Sam the Sham and the Pharaohs (1985) Rhino 122

As Sam the Sham:
Ten of Pentacles [inside labels read "The 10 of Penticles" by Sam the Sham & The Pharaohs] (February 1968) MGM E/SE 4526
Won't Be Long (1994) Samara Productions, Inc. SAM002A

As Sam Samudio:
Sam, Hard and Heavy  (March 1971) Atlantic SD 8271

As Sam and Charity:
Running With the Rabbits (1983)

Singles
As Sam the Sham and the Pharaohs:

As Sam the Sham:

As Sam Samudio:

References

External links
 samthesham.com - Official website archived in 2012
 
  as Domingo Samudio
  as Sam the Sham and The Pharaohs

1937 births
Living people
Musicians from Dallas
American artists of Basque descent
American musicians of Basque descent
Grammy Award winners
American rock singers
MGM Records artists
United States Navy sailors
Rock and roll musicians
Chicano rock musicians
American novelty song performers